Belgrandia silviae is a species of very small aquatic snail, an operculate gastropod mollusk in the family Hydrobiidae.

Distribution
Belgrandia silviae is endemic to Portugal, where it is only known from the type locality, the spring of Alcabideque, 10 km to the south of Coimbra in the province of Beira Litoral.

References

Hydrobiidae
Belgrandia
Gastropods described in 2009
Endemic fauna of Portugal